Elsa Lystad (born 9 July 1930) is a Norwegian actress. She made her stage debut in 1956, and her breakthrough as actress came in the mid-1960s. She has since been a central actress in Norwegian film, theatre, television and radio. She was awarded the Leonard Statuette in 1983.

Selected filmography
 Hurra for Andersens! (1966)
 De ukjentes marked (1968)
 Belønningen (1980)

Selected works
Hva er det med meg (autobiography, 1986)

References

1930 births
Living people
Actresses from Oslo
Norwegian stage actresses
Norwegian film actresses
Norwegian television actresses
Norwegian autobiographers
Leonard Statuette winners
Women autobiographers